The Whereabouts of Jenny is a 1991 American drama film directed by Gene Reynolds and written by John Miglis. The film stars Ed O'Neill, Debrah Farentino, Eve Gordon, David Graf, Dakin Matthews and Lee Garlington. The film premiered on ABC on January 14, 1991.

Plot

Cast 
Ed O'Neill as Jimmy O'Meara
Debrah Farentino as Liz
Eve Gordon as Theresa
David Graf as Scranton
Dakin Matthews as Cox
Lee Garlington as Gina
Arnetia Walker as Louise
Steven Williams as Mick
Savannah Smith Boucher as Roosevelt
Cliff Bemis as Barker
Cassy Friel as Jenny
Dan Hedaya as Vinnie
Mike Farrell as Van Zandt
Michael Crabtree as DeSantos
Abraham Alvarez as Judge Ruiz
Vinny Argiro as FBI Agent Borelli
Harold Ayer as Judge Powers
Catherine Rusoff as Andrea
Kathleen Coyne as Psychiatrist
Ellen Crawford as Clerk
Al Mancini as Mr. Russo
Sylvia Short as Rose
Ta-Tanisha as Scranton's Secretary
Victor Contreras as Garcia

References

External links
 

1991 television films
1991 films
1990s English-language films
American drama films
1991 drama films
1990s American films